Li Wei (born 9 March 1979) is a Chinese former swimmer who competed in the 2000 Summer Olympics.

References 

1979 births
Living people
Chinese female breaststroke swimmers
Olympic swimmers of China
Swimmers at the 2000 Summer Olympics
Asian Games medalists in swimming
Asian Games gold medalists for China
Asian Games silver medalists for China
Medalists at the 1998 Asian Games
Swimmers at the 1998 Asian Games
20th-century Chinese women
21st-century Chinese women